Sir Gregor Ian Smith is a Scottish general practitioner (GP), who has served as the Chief Medical Officer for Scotland since December 2020. He previously served in the position of Deputy Chief Medical Officer and from April 2020, until his appointment, served as Chief Medical Officer on an interim basis. 

A medicine graduate of the University of Glasgow Medical School, Smith served as a general practitioner doctor in Larkhall. He served as the Director for Primary Care at NHS Lanarkshire, before being appointed Deputy Chief Medical Officer for Scotland in 2015. On 5 April 2020 he served in the position of CMO on an interim basis, following the resignation of Dr Catherine Calderwood. Smith was confirmed on a permanent basis on 23 December 2020.

Early life and education

Smith attended Uddingston Grammar School and studied medicine at University of Glasgow, graduating in 1994.

Career

General practice
Smith worked as a general practitioner doctor in Larkhall, as well as serving as the Director for Primary Care within NHS Lanarkshire. Smith is an Honorary Clinical Associate Professor at the University of Glasgow and Fellow of both the Scottish Patient Safety Programme and Salzburg Global.

Deputy Chief Medical Officer for Scotland
Smith was appointed as Deputy Chief Medical Officer for Scotland in 2015, serving with Catherine Calderwood who was appointed Chief Medical Officer.

Chief Medical Officer for Scotland

Following the sudden resignation of Calderwood in April 2020, Smith was requested by the Scottish Government to act as interim Chief Medical Officer for Scotland, taking a lead role in the Scottish Government response to COVID-19 pandemic in Scotland.

Smith took part in his first Scottish Government press briefing on 6 April 2020 at St Andrew's House in Edinburgh, alongside First Minister of Scotland Nicola Sturgeon and Cabinet Secretary for Health and Sport, Jeane Freeman.

Smith was confirmed as the permanent job holder in December 2020. He was knighted in the 2022 New Year Honours for services to public health.

References

Living people
COVID-19 pandemic in Scotland
Chief Medical Officers for Scotland
Alumni of the University of Glasgow
21st-century Scottish medical doctors
Year of birth missing (living people)
Knights Bachelor